Wysokie  is a village in the administrative district of Gmina Czerwieńsk, within Zielona Góra County, Lubusz Voivodeship, in western Poland.

The village has a population of 136.

References

Wysokie